Capt. Sir Paul Henry William Studholme, 2nd Baronet (16 January 1930 – 1990) was a British Army officer and landowner.

Life
He was the son of Sir Henry Gray Studholme, 1st Bt. and Judith Joan Mary Whitbread. He was educated at Eton College and Royal Military Academy Sandhurst

He married Virginia Katherine Palmer, daughter of Sir Richmond Palmer, on 2 March 1957. He died in 1990, aged 60, and was succeeded in the baronetcy by his son  Henry William Studholme, 3rd Bt.

See also 
 Studholme baronets

References

Kidd, Charles, Williamson, David (editors). Debrett's Peerage and Baronetage (1990 edition). New York: St Martin's Press, 1990.

1930 births
1990 deaths
People educated at Eton College
Graduates of the Royal Military Academy Sandhurst
Baronets in the Baronetage of the United Kingdom
Moorhouse–Rhodes family